Transverse City is the seventh studio album by American recording artist Warren Zevon, released in October 1989 by Virgin Records. It features appearances from a number of prominent musicians, including guitarists Neil Young, David Gilmour (of Pink Floyd), Jerry Garcia (of Grateful Dead) and Mike Campbell (of Tom Petty and the Heartbreakers), as well as jazz pianist Chick Corea.

Track listing
All tracks composed by Warren Zevon, except where indicated.

Personnel
Warren Zevon – vocals, guitar, harmonica, piano, keyboards, harmony
Jorge Calderón – bass and harmony on "Networking"; harmony on "Gridlock"
Mike Campbell – guitar on "Splendid Isolation"; guitar and mandolin on "Nobody's in Love This Year"
Jack Casady – bass on "They Moved the Moon" and "Gridlock"
Chick Corea – piano on "The Long Arm of the Law"
Howie Epstein – banjo, mandolin on "Networking"; bass on "Down in the Mall"
Jerry Garcia – guitar on "Transverse City" and "They Moved the Moon"
David Gilmour – guitar on "Run Straight Down"
Bob Glaub – bass 
Richie Hayward – drums 
Mark Isham – flugelhorn on "Nobody's in Love This Year"
Rob Jaczko – miscellaneous percussion
Jorma Kaukonen – acoustic guitar and harmony on "Gridlock"
David Lindley – saz, steel guitar, oud, harmony vocals, lap steel guitar on "Down in the Mall"
John Patitucci – bass on "Transverse City"
J.D. Souther – harmony vocals on "Run Straight Down", "Turbulence" and "Nobody's in Love This Year"
Benmont Tench – organ on "Networking"
Waddy Wachtel – acoustic guitar on "Run Straight Down", "Networking" and "Nobody's in Love This Year"
Neil Young – lead guitar on "Gridlock", harmony vocals on "Splendid Isolation"
Jordan Zevon – harmony vocals on "The Long Arm of the Law"

Production
Producers: Warren Zevon, Duncan Aldrich, Andrew Slater
Engineers: Duncan Aldrich, John Cutler, Andrew Jackson, Andy Jackson, Rob Jaczko, Tim Mulligan
Assistant engineers: Heidi Hanschu, Robert Reed, Ira Rubnitz
Mixing: Rob Jaczko
Design: Jimmy Wachtel
Art direction: Jimmy Wachtel
Photography: Jonathan Exley, Nels Israelson, Jimmy Wachtel

Charts
Singles

References

Warren Zevon albums
Cyberpunk music
1989 albums
Virgin Records albums
Albums with cover art by Jimmy Wachtel